Inonotus tamaricis is a species of fungus in the family Hymenochaetaceae. A plant pathogen, it grows on dead and living Tamarix species, and is found in Southern Europe, North Africa, Syria and Senegal, Southern Asia and east to China.

References

External links 
 

Fungal tree pathogens and diseases
tamaricis
Fungi described in 1904
Fungi of Africa
Fungi of Asia
Fungi of Europe